The murder of Zhang Miao (张妙) by Yao Jiaxin (药家鑫) was an intentional homicide case in China. On October 20, 2010, Yao Jiaxin, a 21-year-old music student from Xi'an, Shaanxi Province, ran down and injured a restaurant waitress, Zhang Miao, while driving, then got out of his car and stabbed her to death when he saw her memorizing his license plate number. Yao was put on trial on March 23, 2011, was sentenced to death on April 22, 2011, and executed on June 7, 2011. This case brought much public attention because of Yao’s family background and whether the death penalty was improper.

Summary 
On the night of October 20, 2010, Yao Jiaxin, a pianist studying at Xi’an Conservatory of Music, hit cafe waitress Zhang Miao with his Chevrolet Cruze as she was riding her bicycle. When he got out of the car, he found Zhang trying to memorize his license plate number. As he was afraid that Zhang would get him in trouble or ask for compensation over this accident, he took out a knife and stabbed her eight times until she died. When he was trying to escape, he hit two other people on the road and was eventually apprehended. However, the police released him because of lack of evidence. The police did not manage to properly connect the two accidents and charge him with murder until October 22. 

Yao confessed on October 23, and was put on trial on March 23, 2011 at the Xi’an Intermediate People’s Court. Since he had shown remorse for the murder, it was quite likely that he would escape the death penalty. However, after this case was exposed by the media and discussed heatedly on the internet, most netizens demanded Yao receive the death penalty. Using Human Flesh Search, people were able to discover that Yao's father was a well-placed military representative in Xi’an, which added to popular resentment of him.

On the other hand, a crime psychologist, Li Meijin, made controversial comments on the case in an interview on China Central Television, which were also maligned by netizens. She posited that Yao’s behavior in stabbing the woman eight times was related to his miserable experience of playing piano during his childhood. ‘His behavior of stabbing the victim eight times could have been a mechanical repetition of him hitting the piano keys’, said Li.  However, she was seen as an unabashed apologist for Yao. Netizens called her the 'defender of a murderer' and also launched a Human flesh search engine to discredit her. Many people also thought that the state media coverage of the case was biased, as it covered only the murderer without any empathy for the victim.

Discussion

The education system 
During the trial, Yao's lawyer pleaded for leniency by saying Yao was a 'model student', with many awards for academic excellence.

This was very ironic and led to heated discussion over the Chinese education system. While most parents only care about children's grades, they care less about their character and moral compass. Such a rigid education deprives children of their natural development and makes them indifferent about life.

Abolition of death penalty 
There was a heated debate on the internet by many public figures about whether capital punishment in China should be abolished. The debate was triggered by the murder case of Yao. According to an online Yahoo survey about whether Yao should get the death penalty, 96.5% (10,710 out of 11,100) of the respondents said that he should. One of the reasons for the widespread public outrage towards Yao is that they were afraid that China would be controlled by jungle law.

Result of trial and responses 
Yao was found guilty by the Xi'an Intermediate People's Court, and sentenced to death on April 22, 2011. He appealed the court's decision to the Shaanxi Provincial Higher People's Court, which rejected his appeal on May 20. The Supreme People's Court reviewed the case and upheld the death sentence, concluded that the first and second trials were without error. 'The motive was extremely despicable, the measures extremely cruel and the consequences extremely serious,' said the SPC. Yao was executed on June 7, 2011.

Public reaction towards the execution varied on the internet. Some claimed that it was a victory for public action over the privileged class, while others considered Yao a victim of cyberstalking/online mobs.

See also
Li Gang incident

References

External links

October 2010 crimes
2010 murders in China
Xi'an
2010 road incidents
2010s road incidents in Asia